Against the Odds may refer to:
"Against the Odds" (TV series), an early 1980s Nickelodeon show
"Against the Odds" (song), a 2011 song by Danish singer Christopher
Against the Odds (novel), from 2000, the seventh and last novel of Familias Regnant universe by Elizabeth Moon
Against the Odds: Making a Difference in Global Health, a 2008 exhibition at the United States National Library of Medicine 
 Against the Odds, the 1997 autobiography of British inventor and industrialist James Dyson co-written by Giles Coren

See also
 Against All Odds (disambiguation)